Summer in Tyrol is a 1964 Danish comedy film directed by Erik Balling and starring Dirch Passer. The film is based on the Austrian operetta Im weißen Rößl.

Cast
 Dirch Passer as Leopold Ulrik Joackim Brantmeyer
 Susse Wold as Josepha Gabriela Maria Vogelhuber
 Ove Sprogøe as Sigismund Sülzheimer
 Karl Stegger as Julius Müller
 Lone Hertz as Klara Müller
 Peter Malberg as Kaiser Franz Joseph
 Jan Priiskorn-Schmidt as Young Waiter
 Gyda Hansen as Lena
 Paul Hagen as Photographer Schmidt
 Elith Foss as The Mayor
 Ole Monty as The Travel Guide
 Jytte Abildstrøm as Guest at inn
 Agnes Rehni as Guest at inn
 Bjørn Spiro as Guest with moustache
 Gunnar Bigum as Man answering the phone

References

External links

1964 films
1964 comedy films
Danish comedy films
1960s Danish-language films
Films directed by Erik Balling
Films with screenplays by Erik Balling
Films set in Austria
Films set in the 1900s
Films set in restaurants
Danish films based on plays
Films based on adaptations
Films based on operettas
Films scored by Robert Stolz
Films set in Austria-Hungary
Cultural depictions of Franz Joseph I of Austria